Dorothee Wenner is a German film curator and journalist. She has served as curator at the Berlin International Film Festival since 1990. She is also a founding jury member of the Africa Movie Academy Awards.

References

External links
 

Year of birth missing (living people)
Living people
Film curators
Film people from Berlin